The 2019 Silverstone FIA Formula 3 round was a motor racing event held on 13 and 14 July 2019 at the Silverstone Circuit, Towcester, United Kingdom. It was the fourth round of the 2019 FIA Formula 3 Championship, and ran in support of the 2019 British Grand Prix

Classification

Qualifying 
The Qualifying session took place on 12 July 2019, with Jüri Vips scoring pole position.

Race 1

Race 2

See also 

 2019 British Grand Prix
 2019 Silverstone Formula 2 round

References

External links 
Official website

|- style="text-align:center"
|width="35%"|Previous race:
|width="30%"|FIA Formula 3 Championship2019 season
|width="40%"|Next race:

2019 FIA Formula 3 Championship
2019 in British sport
2019 in British motorsport